José Rodrigues Oiticica (1882–1957), was a Brazilian anarchist, poet, and activist. He was founder and editor of the anarchist journal Ação direta (Direct Action), between 1946 until his death. He was the son of Brazilian senator .

References

External links
 Poems and texts of José Oiticica
 Ponto de vista.jor

20th-century Brazilian poets
Brazilian male poets
Brazilian male dramatists and playwrights
Brazilian anarchists
Brazilian philologists
1882 births
1957 deaths
20th-century Brazilian dramatists and playwrights
20th-century Brazilian male writers
20th-century philologists